Falilat Ogunkoya-Osheku (born 5 December 1968 in Ode Lemo, Ogun State, Nigeria) is a Nigerian former track and field athlete who holds the distinction of becoming the first Nigerian to win an individual track and field medal at the Olympic games.

Ogunkoya has won a number of national championships, including a gold medal in 1996 in the 400 metres, gold in the 200 metres and 400 m in 1998, and gold again in 1999 and 2001 in the 400 m. At the 1987 All Africa Games in Nairobi she won the silver medal in the 200 m. In 1995 at the All Africa Games in Harare she won the silver in the 400 m, and at the 1999 Games in Johannesburg she won a gold medal in the 400 m.

At the 1996 Summer Olympics  Ogunkoya won a bronze medal in the 400 m, behind Marie-José Pérec of France and Cathy Freeman of Australia, in a personal best and African record of 49.10, which is currently the twelfth fastest of all time. It marked the first time a Nigerian athlete won a medal in an individual track and field event.

Achievements

References

External links

1968 births
Living people
Sportspeople from Ogun State
Nigerian female sprinters
Yoruba sportswomen
Mississippi State University alumni
Athletes (track and field) at the 1988 Summer Olympics
Athletes (track and field) at the 1996 Summer Olympics
Athletes (track and field) at the 2000 Summer Olympics
Olympic athletes of Nigeria
Olympic silver medalists for Nigeria
Olympic bronze medalists for Nigeria
Medalists at the 1996 Summer Olympics
Olympic silver medalists in athletics (track and field)
Olympic bronze medalists in athletics (track and field)
World Athletics Championships athletes for Nigeria
African Games gold medalists for Nigeria
African Games medalists in athletics (track and field)
Goodwill Games medalists in athletics
African Games silver medalists for Nigeria
Athletes (track and field) at the 1987 All-Africa Games
Athletes (track and field) at the 1995 All-Africa Games
Athletes (track and field) at the 1999 All-Africa Games
World Athletics Indoor Championships medalists
Competitors at the 1998 Goodwill Games
Olympic female sprinters
World Athletics U20 Championships winners
Universiade medalists in athletics (track and field)
Universiade bronze medalists for Nigeria
20th-century Nigerian women